Vesna (Cyrillic: Весна) was a mythological female character associated with youth and springtime in early Slavic mythology, particularly within Croatia, Serbia, North Macedonia and Slovenia. Along with her male companion Vesnik, she was associated with rituals conducted in rural areas during springtime. In the nineteenth century, Russian peasants celebrated the return of spring on March 1 by going out to the fields, carrying a clay figure of a lark on a pivot which had been decorated with flowers. They sang songs naming the spring season Vesna.  
The word "vesna" is still the poetic word for "spring" in Slovene, as well as Czech and Slovak. In Russian, Polish, Ukrainian, and Belarusian, vesna/wiosna is the actual word for 'spring'. The month February is sometimes named  in Slovene. In Serbian, the word  is used to denote someone who heralds or brings about springtime. 
It is likely that Vesna was originally a goddess representing the earth during the spring, making her an alternate form of Mokosh.

In mythology
In Slavic mythology, beautiful women called "" lived in palaces atop mountains where they discussed the fate of crops and of human inhabitants. A magical circle around their palaces kept them from leaving the mountain top except during February, when they would travel in wooden carts down to the valley below. Only certain people were capable of hearing them singing.

In popular culture
The story of Vesna and the Sun Prince gave inspiration to the 1983 Czechoslovak short film A Ballad About Green Wood, directed by Jiří Barta. Vesna was featured on a Slovenian postage stamp in 2005.

See also
Vesna (name)

Notes

References
Abbott, George Frederick (1903). Macedonian Folklore.

External links

Slavic pseudo-deities
Slavic mythology
Slovene mythology
Female legendary creatures